Arthur James "Zutty" Singleton (May 14, 1898 – July 14, 1975) was an American jazz drummer.

Career

Singleton was born in Bunkie, Louisiana, United States, and raised in New Orleans. According to his Jazz Profiles biography, his unusual nickname, acquired in infancy, is the Creole word for "cute". He was working professionally with Steve Lewis by 1915. He served with the United States Navy in World War I. After returning to New Orleans he worked with Papa Celestin, Big Eye Louis Nelson, John Robichaux, and Fate Marable. He left for St. Louis, Missouri, to play in Charlie Creath's band, then moved to Chicago.

In Chicago, Singleton played with Doc Cook, Dave Peyton, Jimmie Noone, and theater bands, then joined Louis Armstrong's band with Earl Hines. In 1928 and 1929, he performed on landmark recordings with Louis Armstrong and his Hot Five. In 1929 he moved with Armstrong to New York City.

In addition to Armstrong in New York he played with Bubber Miley, Tommy Ladnier, Fats Waller, Jelly Roll Morton and Otto Hardwick. He also played in the band backing Bill Robinson. In 1934, Singleton returned to Chicago. He returned to New York in 1937, working with Mezz Mezzrow and Sidney Bechet.

In 1943, he moved to Los Angeles, where he led his own band, played for motion pictures, and appeared on the radio program The Orson Welles Almanac (1944). He also worked with  Slim Gaillard, Wingy Manone, Eddie Condon, Nappy Lamare, Art Hodes, Oran "Hot Lips" Page, and Max Kaminsky.

Death
Singleton retired after suffering a stroke in 1970. He died in New York City in 1975 at the age of 77. His wife Margie (sister of Charlie Creath) died in 1982 at the age of 82.

References

1898 births
1975 deaths
People from Bunkie, Louisiana
Burials at Long Island National Cemetery
20th-century American drummers
20th-century American male musicians
African-American drummers
American jazz drummers
American male drummers
Dixieland jazz musicians
American male jazz musicians
Louis Armstrong and His Hot Five members
Tuxedo Brass Band members
20th-century African-American musicians